Dalin is a railway station on the Taiwan Railways Administration (TRA) West Coast line located in Dalin Township, Chiayi County, Taiwan.

See also
 List of railway stations in Taiwan

References

1903 establishments in Taiwan
Railway stations in Chiayi County
Railway stations opened in 1903
Railway stations served by Taiwan Railways Administration